The San Jose Prune Pickers (also called the Bears, Fullers, Brewers, Dukes, Athletics and simply San Jose Baseball Club) were a minor league baseball team located in San Jose, California. They competed in the California League and its various offshoots and predecessors on and off from 1885 through 1915. 

The city would later be represented in the minor leagues by the San Jose Red Sox and San Jose Giants.

External links
Baseball Reference

Defunct California League teams
Defunct California State League teams
Defunct Pacific Coast League teams
Baseball teams established in 1885
Baseball teams in San Jose, California
Baseball teams disestablished in 1915
1885 establishments in California
1915 disestablishments in California
Defunct baseball teams in California